Ernest Ten Eyck Attwell (March 2, 1877 – August 6, 1949) was the third head football coach at Tuskegee University  in Tuskegee, Alabama and he held that position for 11 seasons, from 1902 until 1912.  His coaching record at Tuskegee was 31–17–4. He was born in New York in 1877. He was married to Drusilla Nixon, a community activist and music educator.

Attwell died of an apparent heart attack at Grand Central Terminal in August 1949.

References

1877 births
1949 deaths
Tuskegee Golden Tigers football coaches
Sportspeople from New York City